William II (or III) (late 980s – 1019), called the Pious, was the Count of Provence.

Life
William was the son of William I (or II) of Provence and Adelaide-Blanche of Anjou, who were married by January 984. William appears in the documents of his father from 992, and succeeded the elder William on the latter's retirement to a monastery just before his death in 994, but as a minor he fell under the control of his paternal uncle, Rotbold I, who would intervene with William and his mother, Adelaide, until Rotbold's death in 1008. William did not succeed to the margravial title, which went to Rotbold. 

By 1013, he had married Gerberga, daughter of Otto-William, Count of Burgundy and Ermentrude, Countess of Mâcon and Besançon. Due to his relative youth, throughout his rule William faced challenges from the Provençal lords, including the seizing of his family's ecclesiastical interests.  These conflicts escalated until William died 4 March 1019, while fighting the castellans of Fos and Hyères, and the two widows, Adelaide and Gerberga, were forced to call on the assistance of Adelaide's older son, William III, Count of Toulouse, to protect the birthright of the young heirs.

Family
Together William and Gerberga had:
 William IV of Provence († ), who succeeded his father.
 Fulk Bertrand of Provence († 27 Apr. 1051), Count of Provence.
 Geoffrey I of Provence († ), Count of Arles, Margrave of Provence.

Notes

References

Sources

See also
 Jean-Pierre Poly, La Provence et la société féodale 879–1166 (Paris: Bordas, 1976)

Counts of Provence
980s births
1018 deaths

Year of birth uncertain